Canal 10 (call sign LW 83 TV) is one of the two free-to-air channels in the province of Tucumán, Argentina. It is owned and run by the National University of Tucumán. Its headquarters and studios are located in Yerba Buena with transmitter in Villa Nougués.

Channel 10 went on air on July 9, 1966. At first, it began broadcasting cultural programming, but soon it turned into a more commercial station. Color transmission began in 1980, and it remained the only free-to-air channel until 1983 when LRK 458 TV Channel 8 was founded. Since the 1990s, LW 83 has primarily rebroadcast the national programming of El Trece in Buenos Aires.

Local programs

Current local shows
 Los Primeros (News): Mon-Fri from 6:30am to 9:30am
 TV Prensa (News): Mon-Fri at 1:00pm and 9:00pm 
 La Santa Misa (Religion): Sundays at 11:00am 
 Primer Plano (Current Affairs): Saturdays at 8:00pm
 Un Día a la Semana (Miscellaneous): Saturdays at 2:00pm

Local shows featured in the past
 Canal 10 Informa (News) 
 Sábados para Todos (Miscellaneous)
 Deportivo 10 (Sports)
 Ciudadanos (Current Affairs)

Repeaters
Canal 10 has repeaters in Choromoro (channel 2), Tafí del Valle (channels 4 and 10), Trancas (channel 5) and San Pedro de Colalao (channel 7).

Television stations in Argentina
Mass media in San Miguel de Tucumán
Television channels and stations established in 1966